Kahawa is a suburb settlement spanning the Kiambu County and Nairobi County borders along Thika Road. It is administratively divided into four wards across the two counties: Kahawa and Kahawa West wards in Nairobi county and Kahawa Wendani and Kahawa Sukari wards in Kiambu county.  Despite its proximity to the city, half of it is administratively in Ruiru, while some parts, such as Kenyatta University, Kahawa Barracks, Kiwanja and Githurai 44, are administratively in Roysambu.

The Kahawa region
Originally a coffee growing region, the Kahawa region is generally subdivided into four electoral wards as follows:

Kahawa Barracks 

The Kahawa Barracks area (which partly forms the border with Nairobi County) was the site of a British Army base before Kenya's independence and now hosts the Kahawa Army Base of Kenyan Army.

Transport 
Kahawa lies to the north of Githurai, another inter-county suburb and settlement along the Kenya-Uganda Railway.  In 2016, this town started to be served by suburban trains of the Nairobi rail service.

See also
 Ruiru
 Githurai
 Kasarani
 Dandora
 Ongata Rongai

References

Populated places in Kenya